Ethmia crocosoma is a moth in the family Depressariidae. It is found in India and Nepal. Records for Taiwan are probably based on misidentifications.

The forewings are whitish-grey, with black spots. The hindwings are darker brownish-grey, but lighter on the fringe of the apex.

References

Moths described in 1914
crocosoma